Dr. Gary Wayne Hall Sr. (born August 7, 1951) is an American former competition swimmer, three-time Olympic medalist, and former world record-holder in five events. He is also a former ophthalmologist.

Background
Hall attended Indiana University, where he swam for the Indiana Hoosiers swimming and diving team under coach Doc Counsilman. As a college swimmer, he specialized in the individual medley. Hall was elected captain of the Hoosiers swimming team in his senior year.  In academics, Hall excelled in the classroom and was consistently cited by the NCAA as an outstanding example of student-athlete.  He was accepted for medical school at the University of Cincinnati.  He later became an ophthalmologist, and practiced in Phoenix, Arizona.

Hall first represented the United States in the 1968 Summer Olympics held in Mexico City, Mexico, where he won a silver medal for his second-place finish in the men's 400-meter individual medley.  Two years later he broke the world record in the 200-meter butterfly.

Hall made it a point to vigorously exercise in the swimming pool after daily med school classes. His wife, the former Mary Keating, being from a swimming family, understood his love of the water.

At the 1972 Summer Olympics in Munich, Germany, he earned a silver medal in the men's 200-meter butterfly.  His final Olympic appearance was at the 1976 Summer Olympics in Montreal, Canada, capping his Olympic career with a bronze medal in the men's 100-meter butterfly.  At the end of the Montreal Olympics, his fellow American athletes from all sports disciplines, chose him to be the U.S. flagbearer in the closing ceremony.

Ophthalmologist career
Hall graduated from the University of Cincinnati College of Medicine, located in Cincinnati, Ohio.  He practiced as Dr. Gary Hall, MD as an ophthalmologist in Phoenix, Arizona at the Gary Hall Lasik Center. Common conditions he treated in Ophthalmology included Macular degeneration and Cataracts. Dr. Hall was a recipient of the NCAA Silver Anniversary Award for his outstanding career in Ophthalmology.

Ophthalmology History of Malpractice

In January 1996, Hall was ordered by the Arizona Medical Board to spend three years on probation and to pay the board $10,000 to cover the costs of an investigation, the details of which are no longer on the board's site.
In October 1999, Hall was placed on probation for three more years and he was censured for unprofessional conduct, permanently prohibited from performing certain procedures, forced to take additional educational courses, and pay a penalty of $15,000. In April 2005, the Arizona Medical Board placed Hall on probation for another five years, with the demand that he never perform surgery again.
On October 2009, after being found in violation of the demands of the Arizona Medical Board, Dr. Gary Hall was stripped of his medical license by the Arizona Medical Board. The Board found that Hall had been guilty of unprofessional conduct, negligence, and incompetence in his practice. 

An article from the Phoenix New Times indicates that Gary Hall has had 121 complaints lodged against him to the Arizona Medical Board since he began practicing in 1982. It is unknown how many complaints Gary Hall accumulated against him in 2009 when he his license was finally revoked. 

An article from the LA times cites that as of June 2000, Gary Hall had paid over $5.3 million dollars in medical malpractice claims and is listed 27 times in the federal database for medical malpractice.

International Swimming Hall of Fame
In 1981, Hall was inducted into the International Swimming Hall of Fame as an "Honor Swimmer." Later on, he also became a local celebrity in Phoenix, as an ophthalmologist – appearing in his office's television ads and billboard campaigns.

His son Gary Hall Jr. became a famous Olympic swimmer as well, starting in the Atlanta 1996 Olympic Games, getting various gold medals at the 2000 Olympics in Sydney, Australia. With his son's participation at the 2004 Olympics in Athens, Greece, the Halls became the first father-and-son pair to make three Olympic appearances.

Swimming camps
Gary Hall Sr.  currently lives in San Diego and operates The Race Club swimming camps.  The Race Club is a swimming club founded by Gary Hall Jr. and his father Gary Hall Sr.  The swimming club, originally known as "The World Team," was designed to serve as a swimming training group for elite swimmers across the world in preparation for the 2000 Sydney Olympic Games. To be able to train with The Race Club, one must either have been ranked in the top 20 in the world the past 3 calendar years or top 3 in their nation in the past year. The Race Club included such well known swimmers as Roland Mark Schoeman, Mark Foster, Ryk Neethling, Milorad Čavić and Therese Alshammar. They were coached by University of Michigan coach Mike Bottom.

The Race Club provides facilities, swimming techniques coaching, swimming training programs, technical instruction, swimming technique videos, fitness and health programs for swimmers of all ages and abilities. The Race Club summer swim camps are designed and tailored to satisfy each swimmer's needs, whether one is trying to reach the Olympic Games or simply improve one's swimming techniques or fitness level. The swimming camps programs are suitable for beginner swimmers, pleasure swimmers, fitness swimmers, USA swimming or YMCA swimmers, or triathletes; anyone who wants to improve swimming skills.

See also

 List of Indiana University (Bloomington) people
 List of Olympic medalists in swimming (men)
 World record progression 200 metres backstroke
 World record progression 200 metres butterfly
 World record progression 200 metres individual medley
 World record progression 400 metres individual medley
 World record progression 4 × 200 metres freestyle relay

References

External links

  The Race Club – Official website

1951 births
Living people
American ophthalmologists
American male butterfly swimmers
American male medley swimmers
World record setters in swimming
Indiana Hoosiers men's swimmers
Olympic bronze medalists for the United States in swimming
Olympic silver medalists for the United States in swimming
Sportspeople from Fayetteville, North Carolina
Swimmers at the 1968 Summer Olympics
Swimmers at the 1972 Summer Olympics
Swimmers at the 1976 Summer Olympics
Keating family
Medalists at the 1976 Summer Olympics
Medalists at the 1972 Summer Olympics
Medalists at the 1968 Summer Olympics
20th-century American people